The mansion/manor home (dwór) in Michałowice village, Lesser Poland province, Poland, designed by prominent architect Teodor Talowski (1857 - 1910), and reminiscent of a suburban villa, was constructed in the years 1892–1897, for the noble (szlachta) family, Żądło-Dąbrowski z Dąbrówki herbu (coat of arms) Radwan, who moved from Mazovia, Poland.

The manor complex includes: the manor house, a granary, a stable, and a surrounding park.

The manor complex was entered into the Register of Immovable Monuments of Lesser Poland Province (also known as Małopolska voivodeship or Małopolska province) at the Provincial Office for the Protection of Monuments in Kraków.

History

From the 13th to the 18th century, Michałowice village belonged to the monks of Miechów. By royal grant, King Stanisław II Augustus (1732 – 1798), in 1788, for an annual fee to the Academy of Kraków (Jagiellonian University), gave perpetual possession of Michałowice to Hugo Kołłątaj (1750 – 1812), a priest, prominent figure of the Polish Enlightenment, coauthor of the Constitution of 3 May 1791, rector and reformer of Jagiellonian University, and finally Deputy Chancellor of Poland. After Hugo Kołłątaj's death, the estate was taken over by his brother, former cavalry captain Jan Kołłątaj, and then passed to his daughter, Maria (Marianna) Krasicka.

Army major Tadeusz Jerzy Beniamin Żądło-Dąbrowski z Dąbrówki h. Radwan (1829 - 1903) obtained Michałowice village in 1875 from the Kołłątaj family. Tadeusz was married to Maria, née Rostworowska herbu (coat of arms) Nałęcz (1842 - 1927).

Before 1897, near where the brick and stone manor is located today, previously stood a wooden manor, where the Żądło-Dąbrowski family lived. In 1897, after construction of the brick and stone manor, the old manor was pulled down.

The next owner of the estate was the son of Tadeusz Jerzy Beniamin and Maria - Tadeusz Żądło-Dąbrowski (1873-1961). In the late 1920s, Tadeusz owned 732 acres of land, about 1.14286 square miles.

The Dąbrowski manor witnessed historical events, including the 1914 march of Marshal Józef Piłsudski's First Cadre Company under the command of Tadeusz Kasprzycki. Piłsudski's Cadre Company was the first regular division of the Polish Army since the end of the Polish 1863 January Uprising (one of the participants and leaders of the "Red" faction among the insurrectionists was Jarosław Radwan Żądło-Dąbrowski). In 1914, the border between the Austro-Hungarian Empire and Tsarist Poland ran through Michałowice village. The border was marked by two-meter-high posts bearing emblems of the Russian Empire. On 6 August 1914, Austria-Hungary declared war on Russia. At 2:45 a.m. that day, the First Cadre set out to cross the Austro-Hungarian — Russian border. At 9:45 a.m., as the First Cadre knocked down the border posts, and marched past into Tsarist Poland on a mission to liberate several towns from Russian control and ignite an anti-Russian uprising, the Cadre were silent as the Tsarist posts for them symbolically represented the dismemberment known as the Partitions of Poland. The First Cadre was saluted by a group of customs guards and Austrian dragoons staring speechlessly. First Cadre Commissary Aleksander Litwinowicz arrived at the Dąbrowski manor, where the Cadre was fed by, and had lunch with Tadeusz Dąbrowski, before moving on to do battle with the Russian Empire.

The wife of Tadeusz was Jadwiga, née Majewska (1881 - 1964). Their son, Jerzy Zygmunt Radwan Żądło-Dąbrowski (1908-1940), took part in the 1939 Defensive War of Poland (September Campaign). He was murdered in 1940 by the Soviet secret police (NKVD) in the Katyn massacre.

In the 1940s, under the Communist-dominated Polish government, the manor was seized from the proprietors and nationalized. The manor home housed the Peasant Self-help and Cooperative Bank of Słomniki. After the manor home burned down in 1979, it was left in ruins. In 1985, the manor was purchased by the Lorenz family, lovers of monuments and nature, and in particular, Teodor Talowski's architecture. They rebuilt the ruins at their own expense. The manor is currently owned by the Lorenz family.

Beginning on 6 August of various years, commemorative marches on the route of the First Cadre Company have taken place, including a stop at the Dąbrowski Manor in Michałowice, with food and drink served, in remembrance of Tadeusz Dąbrowski feeding the Polish Army in 1914, and the beginnings of Poland's re-emergence from non-existence after the Partitions of Poland.

Architecture

The mansion/manor home (dwór) was designed by prominent architect Teodor Talowski (1857 - 1910) in a picturesque National Romantic and Historicism style for the Żądło-Dąbrowski family and built in the years 1892–1897.

Gallery

See also 
 Polish landed gentry

References

Bibliography

External links
 Music Video (in Polish): "Blessed Are the Merciful" - hymn by the community of Michałowice (released: 27 January 2016); from approximately 01:55 to 02:52 in the video, there appears footage of the Żądło-Dąbrowski manor in Michałowice; (total video length: 7 minutes, 40 seconds)
 Photograph: Bird's-Eye View of Żądło-Dąbrowski manor in Michałowice (Date: 26 October 2013)
 Photograph: Appearance of Żądło-Dąbrowski manor in Michałowice in the 1920s and 1930s
 Photograph: Tadeusz (1873 - 1961) and Jadwiga (1881 - 1964) Żądło-Dąbrowski z Dąbrówki h. Radwan at the Żądło-Dąbrowski manor in Michałowice in the 1930s
 Photograph: Stanisław and Jacek Lorenz (standing on right), owners of the Dąbrowski Manor in Michałowice, during a ceremony there. (Date: 06 August 2017) Source: "Sierpniowy Piknik Wolności w Więcławicach (August Picnic of Freedom in Więcławice)". In 1985, the Lorenz family purchased and began rebuilding the ruins of the manor.
 Photograph: Owners of the Dąbrowski manor, the Lorenz, with participants of a commemorative march of Marshal Józef Piłsudski's First Cadre Company at the manor in Michałowice (Date: 13 August 2016)

Clan of Radwan
Dąbrowski (Radwan)
Buildings and structures in Lesser Poland Voivodeship
Objects of cultural heritage in Poland
Art Nouveau houses
Art Nouveau architecture in Poland
Historicist architecture
Kraków County